St. Mary-Corwin Medical Center is a  medical facility with a Flight For Life base, cancer and stroke center and residency program located in Pueblo, Colorado. It is a part of the Centura Health Network. It specializes in orthopedics, cancer care, emergency services, robot-assisted surgery, breast care and women's services.

History

In 1882, the Sisters of Charity opened St. Mary's Hospital in what had been a two-story boarding house. The hospital eventually outgrew this building and a new, four-story, 90-bed structure was built and used until the mid-1950s. 
 
In 1881 the Colorado Coal and Iron Company (predecessor of the Colorado Fuel & Iron Company- CF&I) hired Dr. Richard Corwin to start a company medical clinic in Pueblo. The first building was located on company grounds near the Minnequa Plant in south Pueblo and became known as Minnequa Hospital. In 1882, a typhoid outbreak among the iron workers overwhelmed the small hospital, so a larger 30-bed facility was built. In 1902, a completely new, 200-bed facility was built near Lake Minnequa. Upon the death of Dr. Corwin in 1929, the hospital renamed itself in honor of its founding physician. 

By the late 1940s, the CF&I wanted to get out of the healthcare business and St. Mary's was aggressively seeking funds for needed expansion. Based on the Sister's good reputation, the board of directors voted to transfer ownership of Corwin Hospital to them for $1.

In 1950, Corwin Hospital consisted of three two-story wings and 200-beds. In 1953, the Sisters of Charity decided to consolidate both hospitals. St. Mary's would be razed and Corwin Hospital would be expanded by building over and around the existing structure. The new St. Mary-Corwin Medical Center was dedicated in 1957. With nearly 500 beds and its advanced medical equipment it drew new specialists to the area and was followed by a medical office building, outpatient pharmacy, EEG Lab, cafeteria and dining room. A psychiatric unit opened in 1960 followed by an on-site blood bank in 1961 and the hospital's first intensive care unit in 1962. 

In the 1970s, a helipad was built and Flight For Life service was initiated. The Southern Colorado Family Medicine residency clinic was opened and a new, circular-designed ICU was added. In the 1980s another wing was added. The 1990s brought about the opening of a new clinic, the St. Mary-Corwin Health Center on Pueblo's northside. In 1995, the Sisters of Charity joined with other Catholic healthcare providers to form Catholic Health Initiatives (CHI). The following year, Colorado CHI hospitals signed a joint operating agreement with the Portercare Adventist Health System to form a new management company, Centura Health.

Hospital

Specialties and Departments
 Breast Center
 Joint Replacement Center- Orthopedics
 Dorcy Cancer Center
 Diagnostic Imaging (X-Ray)
 Emergency Services
 GI/Endoscopy
 Health at Home
 Cardiovascular
 Physician Practices
 Robotic-Assisted Surgery
 Surgical Services

References

External links
Official website

Hospitals in Colorado
Buildings and structures in Pueblo, Colorado
Hospitals established in 1882
1882 establishments in Colorado
Hospital buildings completed in 1957